Eraviperoor  is a village in Thiruvalla Taluk,Pathanamthitta district in the state of Kerala . Eraviperoor is the part of Thiruvalla Taluk in east location and is part of the Aranmula legislative assembly constituency.It Comes Under Thiruvalla Sub-District.Located At 8 km Distance From Thiruvalla Sub-District Headquarter And NH 183 In Thiruvalla City India.

Demographics
 India census, Eraviperoor had a population of 26,038 with 12,324 males and 13,714 females. This village is a 'Panchayat' & in the Aranmula legislative assembly. by way of its administrative status within the District of 'Pathanamthitta' in central Keralam state of India.It has become the first grama panchayat in Kerala to provide free WiFi for the general public.

Origin of name
Eraviperoor Means Eravi's Land. Also known as "ഈരവിയുടെ പെരിയ ഊര്".
The region ruled by Eravi were known by this name, later it was changed into Eravipuram " ഈരവിപുരം".
After many centuries the name was changed to Eraviperoor "ഇരവിപേരൂര്‍"

References

There is another village called Eravipuram in Kollam District in Keralam. So, Eraviperoor is Eraviperoor and not derived from Eravipuram.

Villages in Pathanamthitta district
Villages in Thiruvalla taluk

Near Places
Puramattom
Kumbanad
Pullad
Vennikulam
Thiruvalla